Staley is a town in Randolph County, North Carolina, United States. The population was 393 at the 2010 census.

History
The Marley House was listed on the National Register of Historic Places in 1990.

Geography
Staley is located at  (35.794757, -79.551114).

Demographics

As of the census of 2000, there were 347 people, 125 households, and 98 families residing in the town. The population density was 285.9 people per square mile (110.7/km). There were 136 housing units at an average density of 112.1 per square mile (43.4/km). The racial makeup of the town was 82.42% White, 6.34% African American, 2.31% Native American, 5.76% from other races, and 3.17% from two or more races. Hispanic or Latino of any race were 10.09% of the population.

There were 125 households, out of which 38.4% had children under the age of 18 living with them, 63.2% were married couples living together, 13.6% had a female householder with no husband present, and 21.6% were non-families. 19.2% of all households were made up of individuals, and 8.0% had someone living alone who was 65 years of age or older. The average household size was 2.78 and the average family size was 3.10.

In the town, the population was spread out, with 28.2% under the age of 18, 6.9% from 18 to 24, 28.0% from 25 to 44, 25.9% from 45 to 64, and 11.0% who were 65 years of age or older. The median age was 36 years. For every 100 females, there were 93.9 males. For every 100 females age 18 and over, there were 88.6 males.

The median income for a household in the town was $36,964, and the median income for a family was $43,000. Males had a median income of $31,250 versus $22,045 for females. The per capita income for the town was $14,758. About 11.4% of families and 13.6% of the population were below the poverty line, including 22.0% of those under age 18 and 13.9% of those age 65 or over.

References

External links
 Heart of North Carolina Visitors Bureau

Towns in Randolph County, North Carolina
Towns in North Carolina